The Lateran Obelisk is the largest standing ancient Egyptian obelisk in the world, and it is also the tallest obelisk in Italy. It is located in Rome, in the square across from the Archbasilica of St. John Lateran and the San Giovanni Addolorata Hospital.

The obelisk was made around 1400 in Karnak, Egypt, during the reigns of Pharaohs Thutmose III and Thutmose IV. Roman Emperor Constantius II had it moved to Alexandria in the early 4th centuryAD, then in AD357 had it shipped to Rome and erected at the Circus Maximus. The obelisk collapsed sometime after the Circus's abandonment in the 5th century and was buried under mud. It was dug up and restored in the late 1580s, and by the order of Pope Sixtus V was topped with a Christian cross and installed in its present location near the Lateran Palace.

History
Originally, the obelisk was created by Pharaoh Thutmose III (1479–1425 BC) for himself and another for his father, but neither were completed before his death. Thutmose III's grandson, Thutmose IV (1400–1390 BC) finished the obelisks and had them erected to the east of the great temple of Amun in Karnak.

When it was completed, the obelisk now known as the Lateran Obelisk stood at 32 m (105 ft) which was the tallest one in Egypt. Both it and the other obelisk, known as the Obelisk of Theodosius, were brought to Alexandria over the Nile by an obelisk ship in the early 4th century by Constantius II. He intended to bring both obelisks to Constantinople, the new capital for the Roman Empire. The Lateran Obelisk never made it.

Circus Maximus
After the obelisk remained in Alexandria for a few decades, Constantius II had the Lateran obelisk shipped to Rome when he made his only visit there in 357. It was erected near the Egyptian obelisk called the Flaminio, which had stood since 10 BC where it was installed by Augustus to decorate the spina of the Circus Maximus. There they both remained, until after the fall of the Western Roman Empire in the 5th century the Circus Maximus was abandoned and they eventually broke or were taken down. They were eventually buried by mud and detritus carried by a small stream over time.

First person accounts have the original (Roman) base of the monument still in the Circus Maximus as late as 1589. It contained a narrative of Constantius' transport, raising, and dedication of "his father's" obelisk inscribed on its four sides as a long epigram.

Piazza San Giovanni in Laterano
Though pieces of the obelisk were found in the 14th and 15th centuries, serious excavation was only made possible under Pope Sixtus V. The three pieces of the Lateran obelisk were dug up in 1587, and after being restored by architect Domenico Fontana, the obelisk was re-erected approximately  shorter. When it was erected near the Lateran Palace and basilica of St. John Lateran on 9 August 1588, it became the last ancient Egyptian obelisk to be erected in Rome. Its location was formerly the spot where the equestrian statue of Marcus Aurelius stood until 1538, when it was relocated to decorate the Piazza del Campidoglio on Capitoline Hill.

The obelisk was topped with a cross and the pedestal was decorated with inscriptions explaining its Egyptian history and its travels to Alexandria and Rome, mentioning the baptism of Constantine the Great.

Former locations 
  Lateran at Karnak, Egypt: 
  Lateran at Circus Maximus in Rome:

See also

List of obelisks in Rome
List of Egyptian obelisks

References

Bibliography

Further reading

External links 

Ancient Egyptian obelisks
Obelisks in Rome
Thutmose III
Thutmose IV
Rome R. I Monti
Relocated Egyptian obelisks